The Design is the first studio album by the mathcore/metalcore band Into the Moat. It was released in March 8, 2005 by Metal Blade Records.

Track listing
"Century II" - 1:54
"Empty Shell" - 3:40
"Dead Before I Stray" - 2:41
"Guardian" - 3:01
"The Inexorable" - 3:12
"Fortitudine" - 2:49
"Beyond Treachery" - 5:04
"None Shall Pass" - 3:09
"Prologue..." - 7:24

Personnel
 Matt Gossman - drums
 Earl Ruwell – vocals
 Kit Wray – guitar
 Robert Shaffer - guitar
 Joshua Thiel  - bass guitar
 Kevin Lovelost - album layout
 Erik Rutan – producer, engineer, mixing
 Shawn Ohtani – engineer
 Alan Douches - master

References

2005 debut albums
Into the Moat albums